Several ships have been named Syren or Siren for the Sirens of Greek mythology:

 was a snow launched at the Bombay Dockyard for the British East India Company and sold in 1778
Syren was a US 7-gun privateer schooner of  189 tons (bm) commissioned in June 1814 and wrecked in November after she had captured ten British vessels
 was a clipper launched in 1851, sold in Argentina in 1888, and still listed in 1920 as Margarida
 was launched in England in 1863 and made 33 runs through the Union blockade during the American Civil War before Union forces captured her in 1865.
, a Norwegian icebreaker

See also
: one of eight vessels of the British Royal Navy
: one of four vessels of the United States Navy

Notes

Ship names